Texingtal is a town in the district of Melk in the Austrian state of Lower Austria. It was the birthplace of Austrian Chancellor Engelbert Dollfuß

Population

References

Cities and towns in Melk District